Sowing the Wind (French: Graine au vent) is a 1944 French drama film directed by Maurice Gleize and starring Jacques Dumesnil, Marcelle Géniat and Lise Delamare. It is an adaptation of the 1925 novel of the same title by Lucie Delarue-Mardrus The film's sets were designed by the art director Robert-Jules Garnier.

Synopsis
When his wife dies giving birth to a son, a man rejects the child and he is sent away. However, the boy's elder sister takes the lead in taking care of the infant and eventually reconciles her father to him.

Cast
 Jacques Dumesnil as Bruno  
 Marcelle Géniat 
 Lise Delamare as Fernande  
 Carlettina as Alexandra 
 Gisèle Casadesus as Germaine  
 Paul Villé 
 Michel de Bonnay 
 Jean Samson 
 Anne Vandène
 Henri Bargin 
 Yvonne Carletti 
 Maurice Dorléac 
 Maurice Dumont 
 Paul Faivre 
 Ritou Lancyle 
 Albert Malbert 
 Léon Mazeau 
 Christine Stahl 
 Odette Talazac as La nourrice

See also
 Sowing the Wind a 1929 silent film based on the same novel

References

Bibliography 
 Goble, Alan. The Complete Index to Literary Sources in Film. Walter de Gruyter, 1999.

External links 
 

1944 films
French drama films
1944 drama films
1940s French-language films
Films directed by Maurice Gleize
Films based on French novels
Remakes of French films
Lux Film films
French black-and-white films
1940s French films